Barnmoor Green is a village in Warwickshire, England. For populations details see Claverdon.

Villages in Warwickshire